Sparganothis tunicana is a species of moth of the family Tortricidae. It is found in North America in California, Washington, Oregon, Utah, Idaho and British Columbia.

The length of the forewings is 6.5-9.5 mm. The forewings are yellow with brown to purplish-brown markings.

The larvae feed on Trifolium hybridum, Baccharis species, Lomatium nudicaule, Lomatium utriculatum, Pinus ponderosa, Populus species, Trifolium pratense, Rosa species and Lithospermum ruderale.

References

Moths described in 1879
Sparganothis